Bo-Ying Lee ( is a former Chinese actress and Cantonese opera singer from Hong Kong. Lee is credited with over 45 films.

Early life 
Lee’s ancestral hometown is Daliang Subdistrict, Shunde District, Foshan, Guangdong province. Lee started singing because her father took her to a training class of the South China Athletic Association. She has one sister and two brothers. Her father passed away during her months of overseas performance at intermission of her first film.

Career 
Lee started her career as a Cantonese opera singer on radio and her vocal style eventually became known as the Bo-style. 

Lee became an actress in Hong Kong films first in It's Fun Getting Together, a 1954 comedy directed by Chow Sze-Luk. Lee appeared in White Gold Dragon (1954), Third-master Sha, the Heart-Stealer (1954), and How the Scholar Tong Pak-Fu Won the Maid Chau-Heung (1954). Lee appeared as a lead actress in The Scholar Whose Ambition Is to Marry a Princess, a 1955 Cantonese opera film directed by Wong Tin-Lam, and in The Opera Boat at Star Island (aka The Opera Boat in Singapore), a 1955 Drama film directed by Ku Wen-Chung. Lee also appeared as Princess Iron Fan in The Adventures of Nazha, a 1965 Historical Drama directed by Siu Sang and Miu Hong-Nee. Lee's last film was Night of the Opera Stars (aka Goddess of Mercy Celebrates Her Birthday at Xiang Shan), a 1966 Documentary film directed by Wong Hok-Sing. Lee is credited with over 45 films.

Repertoire 
Lee earned her the nickname the Mini-Yim Fun Fong through vocal performances, live on radio as well as albums with Mee Shing (Record) Co. Hong Kong. On stage opposite different co-leads, her choices had been either new debuts or selected from Fong's Repertoire. The female lead had the title role in most of her picks since when a new Troupe was created for her stage performances right before Fong retired. She never played second to or even more junior roles with any female leads on stage.

 The Butterfly Lovers opposite Lam Kar Sing (two versions, quit her career within months and 80 performances overall opposite Lam since the debut of second version)
 The Immortal Zhang Yuqiao, the Most Respectable Courtesan (with blessing of Yim Fun Fong)
 How Prince Xinling Stole the General's Seal to Save the State of Zhao (only opposite Ho Fei-Fan), film version released 30 May 1957 in Hong Kong
 Zheng Cheng-Gong (only opposite Ho Fei-Fan as original cast) 
 Willow Beauty by playwright So Yung (opened in 1973)
 San Kan Yu Mei Liu Jinding
 The Story of Li Wa 
 Martial Heros 
 Injustice Done to Tou Ngo
 Beauty Fades From Twelve Ladies' Tower
 Goddess of the Luo River
 The Dream Encounter Between Emperor Wu of Han and Lady Wa
 Story of Wang Bao Chuan
 A Buddhist Recluse for 14 Years
 An Order to Annihilate Dragon Mountain by playwright So Yung
 The Royal Decree of Exemption from Death by So Yung
 Forty Years of Cherished Love+
 Romance of Liu Yi+

+ Exceptions out of respect for the very senior male lead upon his return to perform in Hong Kong. Same occasion, they put Immortal Zhang Yuqiao, the Most Respectable Courtesan back on stage, first time ever since Fong.

Theater Performance 
 Veteran organizer created a new test troupe for her stage performances right before Fong retired opposite two young up-and-coming co-leads, similar to the style of Fong who hired different, albeit veteran, male co-leads as and when Fong saw fit. 
 Lee never played second to any female leads or even more junior roles on stage. 
 Neither was Lee the original cast of her Repertoire until, years since debut on stage in the very late 1950s, opposite Ho Fei-Fan and others who had decades of experience working with such brand new female co-leads.
 1977, with Da Qun Ying Yue Ju Tuan, Kreta Ayer People's Theatre, Singapore
 1978, 6th Hong Kong Arts Festival
- Butterfly Lovers
- War and Never-ending Love by playwright Poon Cheuk
 1979, The Love Story of the Carp
 1981, one title for 8 shows on 7 days, Hong Kong
 1983, Chinese Opera Fortnight
 1984, four titles/shows on three days in Paris, France 
- San Kan Yu Mei Liu Jinding 
- Lady White Snake
- Goddess of the Luo River
- The Dream Encounter Between Emperor Wu of Han and Lady Wa
 1985, Chinese Opera Fortnight

Filmography

Films 
This is a partial list of films.
 1954 It's Fun Getting Together
 1954 White Gold Dragon 
 1954 Third-master Sha, the Heart-Stealer 
 1954 How the Scholar Tong Pak-Fu Won the Maid Chau-Heung
 1955 The Scholar Whose Ambition Is to Marry a Princess 
 1955 The Opera Boat at Star Island (aka The Opera Boat in Singapore)
 1960 The Revenge of a Forlorn Wife 
 1960 Ten Schoolgirls - Lam Doi-Yuk Choi Ping-Kei. 
 1962 The Jade Hairpin (opposite Ho Fei-Fan)
 1962 The Royal Wedding in the Palace (as Xi Shi)
 1965 The Adventures of Nazha – Princess Iron Fan 
 1966 Night of the Opera Stars (aka Goddess of Mercy Celebrates Her Birthday at Xiang Shan) – Documentary

Discography 
 1954, Lotus Fragrance	(), S-113, (Shellac, 10"), one side
 1959, Two Fools in Hell (LTLP-16)
 1960, Lotus Fragrance	(), M4536
 1965, Gung Hei Faat Coi, S507
 1968, Family Affair (CLT-12-5 or CKL-5128)
 1968, Of Love and Enmity
 1968, Wu Shuang Story (TSLP 2062)
 1969, Why Not Return? (2xLP, Gat)
 1969, Lam Chung
 1970, Huan Chang San Guai (CST-12-1001)
 1970, Drums Along the Battlefield (LP, Album)
 1971, The Revenge Battle 
 Meeting at the Pavilion (aka Butterfly Lovers)
 - one version with Yam Kim-fai (CSLP1005, First released in 1968)
 - one version with Lam Kar Sing
 Lady White Snake
 Young's Female Warrior
 Chai Tou Feng (aka Forty Years of Cherished Love)
 Di Qing's Night of Three Hurdles (aka Shuangyang Princess Chasing The Runaway Husband, TSLP 2063)
 1981, Qing Gong Yuan with Xiaofeng Chen and others

Solo 
 Don't Forget Your Heartfelt Friends (FHLP 541, 1974)

Awards 
 1981 BH for her artistic contributions towards Cantonese Opera.

References

External links 
 Performance on 15 December 1998 at the 90th Anniversary of the birth of Ho Yin who passed away at 75.
 
 
 Lee Bo Ying at hkcinemagic.com
 Lee Bo-Ying at senscritique.com
 Library of Congress Name Authority File (LCNAF) for Li, Baoying

Hong Kong Cantonese opera actresses
Hong Kong film actresses
Living people
Year of birth missing (living people)